Brightline (reporting mark BLFX) is an inter-city rail route between Miami and West Palm Beach, Florida that runs on track owned by Florida East Coast Railway.

Brightline is currently the only privately owned and operated intercity passenger railroad in the United States. Its development started in March 2012 as All Aboard Florida by Florida East Coast Industries, a Florida real estate developer owned by Fortress Investment Group. Construction began in November 2014 and the route opened in January 2018. An extension from West Palm Beach to Orlando International Airport is expected to open in the second quarter of 2023, with additional stops being planned.

Origins and history 

In 2012, All Aboard Florida, a wholly owned subsidiary of Florida East Coast Industries (FECI), announced plans to operate passenger rail service between Miami and Orlando. The construction was projected at the time to be $1.5 billion. In March 2013, All Aboard Florida applied for a $1.6 billion Railroad Rehabilitation & Improvement Financing (RRIF) loan, which was administered by the Federal Railroad Administration, and in late 2014, the company applied for a $1.75 billion private activity bond allocation, with proceeds from the bond sale substantially reducing or replacing entirely the amount of the RRIF loan request.

The company received a Finding of No Significant Impact from the Federal Railroad Administration in January 2013, effectively clearing way for work to begin between Miami and West Palm Beach. The Final Environmental Impact Statement was released on August 4, 2015. By the beginning of 2015, the company had started site work at the Miami, Fort Lauderdale and West Palm Beach stations, plus right of way improvements along stretches of the corridor. On November 10, 2015, All Aboard Florida announced that the service would operate under the name Brightline.

Service between Miami and West Palm Beach began on May 19, 2018.

In September 2018, Brightline acquired XpressWest, a private company that intends to connect Las Vegas with Southern California via Victorville, California. Brightline announced the intent of purchasing 38 acres of land near the Las Vegas Strip for a station and following the Interstate 15 corridor from Las Vegas to Southern California.

Two key counties on the coastal route north of the West Palm Beach station have, for various reasons, been fighting the extension of the rail line through Martin and Indian River Counties in court. One of their objections is that Brightline is owned by a private corporation, so they should not be allowed to issue tax-exempt bonds as if they were a municipality. On December 24, 2018, after four years of legal battles, a Federal District Judge threw out a suit by Indian River County that claimed the U.S. Department of Transportation improperly approved the bond allocation, clearing the way for construction of the new rail corridor through the Treasure Coast and Space Coast. On October 5, 2020, the US Supreme Court declined to hear the appeal of that decision, ending Indian River County's efforts to stymie development. The county's efforts at a Supreme Court hearing were financed with over $200,000 in private donations in addition to over $4 million in County funds.

In April 2019, the company secured $1.75 billion in funding for the Orlando extension and said construction would begin right away.

In November 2018, it was announced that Virgin Group would become a minority investor in the railroad and would provide rights to rebrand the service as Virgin Trains USA. However, in August 2020, railroad managers announced that Virgin had not provided the agreed investment money and the company would be ending its branding deal, returning to the previous Brightline brand. In March 2021, Virgin sued Brightline for $251.3 million because of the broken contract.

Brightline has been described as the deadliest railroad in the United States; in the two years following its launch, more than 40 people were killed by Brightline trains on tracks and at rail crossings. Investigators found none of the deaths were the railroad’s fault, determining that many were suicides or drivers trying to beat the trains.

Construction 

Construction began on the Miami–West Palm Beach section with the laying of new tracks and closure of the temporary surface lots in Government Center, Downtown Miami, in mid 2014. Preliminary work on the Miami station, such as site preparation and demolition, began later in the year. Suffolk Construction was the general contractor for the Miami station. Piles were being set on the four lots of MiamiCentral in early 2015.

On October 29, 2014, work on the Fort Lauderdale station began with the demolition of existing buildings on the site. A groundbreaking ceremony for the West Palm Beach station was held in November 2014. Moss & Associates, of Fort Lauderdale, was the general contractor for the West Palm Beach and Fort Lauderdale stations.

In January 2015, crews started replacing track throughout the corridor. All Aboard Florida secured leasing of easement rights alongside the Beachline from the Central Florida Expressway Authority for $1.4 million in December 2015.

Construction work on Phase 2, between West Palm Beach and Orlando, officially began in June 2019, with a groundbreaking ceremony at Orlando International Airport. Preliminary work on the corridor began in September 2019, in the area of Jensen Beach and Sebastian, and began path clearing for construction of the Orlando–Cocoa portion in October of that year.

, the contractors on the project were the Hubbard Construction Company, Wharton-Smith Inc., The Middlesex Corporation, Granite, and HSR Constructors. These five contractors are responsible for the development of 170 miles of new track into the completed state-of-the-art intermodal facility located in the new South Terminal at the Orlando International Airport (MCO).

In 2019, Brightline operations sent a letter to the city of Boca Raton about the possibility of adding their city as an infill station along the Florida route. Brightline proposed constructing the station and rail infrastructure while the city would cover access and zoning requirements and costs. In December 2019, the former community garden next to the Boca Raton Public Library was officially chosen as a station site for the station.

In October 2019, Miami-Dade County allocated $76 million to build a Brightline Aventura station by the Aventura Mall in Ojus, Florida, between Miami and Fort Lauderdale. At the time of the announcement, the projected opening date was October 2020. Groundbreaking on the station occurred in September 2020. As of February 2023, construction on the Orlando line was approximately 90% complete.

Opening 
Public operations between West Palm Beach and Fort Lauderdale began Saturday, January 13, 2018.  Service between West Palm Beach and Miami began on May 19, 2018. Boca Raton began service on December 21, 2022, while Aventura was delayed for a few days and began service on December 24, 2022.

Effect of the COVID-19 pandemic 
Brightline suspended operations on March 25, 2020, due to the COVID-19 pandemic. All train services were completely closed, and the company cut 250 jobs. Construction north to Orlando continued, as well as plans for the stations in Aventura and Boca Raton.

In January 2021, the company stated that service would begin again in "late 2021," contrary to their earlier estimate of the third quarter of 2021. The company says that most station and operations staff will be brought back approximately 30–60 days before service resumes. Throughout January 2021 and May 2021, the trains ran with no passengers occasionally in order to test an upgraded corridor between the West Palm Beach and Miami train stations. Service resumed on November 8, 2021, between West Palm Beach and Miami, with the Orlando line approximately 70% complete.

Service

Route 
The route is made up of the following stations, from north to south:

Schedule 
, between Miami and West Palm Beach, there are 17 round trips Monday through Friday, ten on Saturdays, and nine on Sundays.
Though not marketed as such, select trains are operated as express services, dropping stops at Boca Raton and Aventura in order to cut travel times between Fort Lauderdale and West Palm Beach.

Ridership 
During the first two and a half months of introductory service between West Palm Beach and Fort Lauderdale, ridership totaled 74,780, increasing from 17,800 in January to 32,900 in March 2018. The company itself announced that the ridership has been triple to what had been expected. The forecast provided to bond investors calls for 240,000 passengers per month by 2020, which includes service to Miami, and analyst Fitch Ratings has said that the company could break even at 56% of their ridership forecast.

By the end of 2018 almost 600,000 passengers had ridden the train, and the line welcomed its 1 millionth rider in August 2019.

In August 2022 Brightline transported over 100,000 passengers for the first time. In December 2022, Brightline served over 183,000 riders.

Ridership by year

Stations 
The five South Florida stations were designed by Skidmore, Owings & Merrill in association with Zyscovich Architects. Rockwell Group designed the interiors. All five have adjacent parking at the rate of $5–6 per day.

Miami 
The station connects Brightline with the Metrorail, Metromover, Metrobus and City of Miami trolley systems. In the future, there will be a Tri-Rail station at MiamiCentral. This increases connections to activities and tourist destinations, including the Performing Arts Center, Bayside Market and Bayfront Park. Service to Miami began on May 19, 2018.

Aventura 

The Aventura station is located on West Dixie Highway west of the Aventura Mall in Ojus, Florida. There are 240 parking spaces at the Aventura station, as well as a Miami-Dade Transit bus drop-off. Complimentary shuttle service is available to and from the mall. In the future, it will include another bridge that will connect the platform to Aventura Mall, and it will serve as the terminus of planned commuter rail service.

Fort Lauderdale 

The Fort Lauderdale station is located at NW 2nd Avenue between Broward Boulevard and NW 4th Street. The four-acre station site has a  station and platform. The Brightline train service in Ft. Lauderdale connects to the Sun Trolley and Broward County Transit system. Brightline also owns about three acres of land to the east of the Florida East Coast Railway corridor, where there are plans to build a transit-oriented development.

Boca Raton 

The Boca Raton station is located next to the Boca Raton Public Library. The station has access to a 455-space parking garage that will also provide dedicated free parking for library patrons.

West Palm Beach 

The West Palm Beach station is located between Datura and Evernia Streets and to the west of Quadrille. The two-acre station site has a  station and platform that connect with the neighborhood's existing vehicular, trolley and pedestrian networks and establish links to the Tri-Rail, Palm Tran Downtown Trolley and Amtrak West Palm Beach station.

Planned and proposed routes and destinations

Orlando 

In 2017, the new Orlando International Airport Intermodal Terminal at Orlando International Airport was opened. Brightline will terminate at this station once the  Orlando Extension track is built. The first test run of the Brightline train into Orlando station happened on May 17, 2022.

The extension is expected to see its first passengers in the second quarter of 2023.

Tampa 
, Brightline is in negotiations with the Florida Department of Transportation (FDOT) to lease right-of-way along the Interstate 4 corridor. Brightline was the only bidder to submit a proposal to construct an intercity rail line along Interstate 4, which has been designated for federally funded high-speed rail. This would be utilized for an extension of the line from Orlando International Airport to Tampa. Potential stops along this route are the SunRail Meadow Woods station and Lakeland. The deadline for the negotiations between Central Florida Expressway Authority, FDOT, and Brightline was March 31, 2020. In September 2020, the railroad entered into a memorandum of understanding with a local developer to potentially construct the terminal station in Ybor City.

In November 2020, Brightline and Walt Disney World Resort announced an agreement to build a station in Disney Springs as a part of its Tampa extension. The high-speed rail corridor between Disney Springs and Orlando International Airport was projected to cost $1 billion and travel alongside Florida State Road 417. While the project has yet to secure needed funding, passenger service was planned to start by 2026. Then, on May 5, 2022, Universal Orlando offered 13 acres of land near the site where Universal's Epic Universe is being built for a commuter station, as well as bond guarantees. This was claimed to promote construction of an extension of Brightline that would include a brief confluence with SunRail between SunRail's Meadow Woods and Pine Castle stations, and lead through Disney eventually to Tampa. They did not mention the existing proposal to run Brightline down SR 417 to Disney Springs. But it did suggest a future SunRail service to Epic Universe, the Orange County Convention Center, and Disney Springs. On June 28, 2022, Disney announced that Brightline would not run on their Walt Disney World park property; however Brightline said it would still build a station near Disney World to get riders as close as possible.

Future expansion 
As part of the initial construction for Brightline, All Aboard Florida said it was considering an extension to Jacksonville, Florida.

In October 2019, Brightline announced plans to start building a station in PortMiami in 2020. However, as of 2022, the plans for the station have been removed from Brightline's website.

Brightline has expressed interest in serving at the Miami Intermodal Center, at the facility where Amtrak plans to relocate its service, but no negotiations are currently underway, according to FDOT.

Brightline has also expressed interest in adding a station on Florida's Treasure Coast and another on the Space Coast between West Palm Beach and Orlando. In August 2018, the company asked cities in the area to submit proposals for station locations. Fort Pierce, which last had passenger train service on July 31, 1968, has expressed interest. The city of Stuart has also indicated that it will be negotiating for a potential station. Brightline has indicated that Stuart is the most likely location for a Treasure Coast station, and that Cocoa would make the most sense for a Space Coast station, both because of proximity to Port Canaveral's cruise lines as well as for positioning for future expansion to Jacksonville. Neither station has been committed in writing, and both are pending market studies, as completion of the line to Orlando is the top priority for Brightline.

Commuter rail

In 2020, it was revealed that Brightline was planning a commuter rail service to complement their existing service. Referred to as the Northeast Corridor, trains would run between MiamiCentral and Aventura with five stations between. Brightline and the Miami-Dade County Commission agreed to access fees in November 2020. The estimated cost for full buildout of the line is $325 million. Operations are expected to start as early as 2024.

The following year, the Florida Department of Transportation and Broward County executed a memorandum of understanding to implement a passenger transportation system along the FEC corridor. Plans call for a  commuter rail route starting at Aventura station in the south and running as far north as Deerfield Beach. Service could start in 2028.

Brightline West 

On September 18, 2018, Fortress Investment Group announced that it would acquire XpressWest, a venture capital proposal to build a privately funded high-speed rail passenger train from Apple Valley, California to Las Vegas, Nevada from hotel developer Marnell Corrao Associates. When Fortress subsequently entered into its partnership with Virgin Group in 2019, it was announced that the newly formed consortium will build and operate XpressWest when it opens. In September 2020, Fortress Investment Group renamed the project Brightline West.

Trains on this line will be fully electric and run alongside Interstate 15. Fortress's Wes Edens has stated that Brightline's service is modeled off of Eurostar's Paris-to-London commute. Its coach design includes white-and-blue interiors, roomy seating, and free Wi-Fi.

Engineering

Train speeds 

The planned travel time between Miami and Orlando is 3 hours. Driving between the two takes  hours using the Florida's Turnpike, and  hours using the I-95/SR 528 freeways along the planned train route via Cocoa. The flight time between MIA and MCO is one hour, not including check-in, security, and last mile transportation.

Pre-existing Miami–Cocoa Corridor upgrades 
The project calls for more than $1.5 billion in upgrades to the rail corridor between Miami and Cocoa. The company is double tracking the corridor, improving signaling systems, and upgrading every grade crossing to meet the highest applicable safety standards set by FDOT and Federal Railroad Administration. In January 2013, the Federal Railroad Administration issued a Finding of No Significant Impact (FONSI) for the Miami–Cocoa phase of the project, effectively clearing the way for work to begin. Part of the corridor safety upgrades includes installing positive train control (PTC), which will enhance Brightline's ability to monitor and control train movements safely.

Quiet zones 
Responding to citizen concerns about increased noise from additional horns, the company stated that it will work with local communities to implement quiet zones where possible. Federal law requires quiet zone requests to originate from the local authority that has jurisdiction over the roadway, not the railroad company.

In August 2014, the company announced a partnership with the Broward and Palm Beach Metropolitan Planning Organizations to implement quiet zones between the city of Hallandale Beach and 15th Street in West Palm Beach. In December 2014, the Miami-Dade Metropolitan Planning Organization approved funding to construct quiet zones between PortMiami and the northern Miami-Dade County line. The quiet zones were originally planned to be in place when Brightline becomes operational between Miami and West Palm Beach by the end of 2017. Brightline started service on January 11, 2018, but various delays in constructing the quiet zones have stretched their in-service date to sometime in March.

On May 14, 2018, quiet zones went into effect in West Palm Beach, in Lake Worth on May 21 and in Boca Raton on May 30. The "no train horn" areas apply to all trains, freight and passenger. Quiet Zones remove the legal duty of a train engineer to sound the horn. Train engineers do still use the horn in quiet zones for emergency situations (such as a trespasser fouling the tracks).

Bridges 
The FEC rail corridor includes a number of fixed-span bridges that will be replaced as part of the project. Most do not require United States Coast Guard (USCG) permitting as they do not span significant navigable waterways and clearances will not change. Twelve other bridges—St. Johns River, Eau Gallie River, St. Sebastian River, Crane Creek, Turkey Creek, West Palm Beach Canal, Boynton Canal, Middle River (both the North and South Fork), Oleta River, Arch Creek and Hillsboro Canal—will require permitting by the USCG. In addition, the project calls for significant investment and upgrades to three movable bridges: St. Lucie, Loxahatchee, and New River. These improvements will ensure that bridge mechanical systems for raising and lowering the bridge spans are either fully upgraded or replaced. The company has stated that, prior to it becoming operational, it will start to regularly notify mariners of scheduled bridge closings via the internet, smart phone application and countdown signage on the bridges to enable mariners to have real-time information to decrease wait times at each bridge. Also, the company will station a bridge tender at the New River bridge.

Deaths 
There have been 60 deaths since Brightline began test runs in 2017, giving it the worst per-mile fatality rate in the nation, according to an ongoing Associated Press analysis that began in 2019. In December 2019, the AP produced a story based on FRA data that Brightline had the worst per-mile death rate of the nation's 821 railroads.

None of Brightline's deaths were caused by crew error or faulty equipment, but were all related to suicides or pedestrians and drivers trying to cross and beat the trains, according to law enforcement and federal reports.

Cocoa–Orlando 
The proposed line between Cocoa and Orlando is the only segment that does not have existing track or right-of-way owned by FEC.

CFX began negotiations with Deseret Ranch, which owns the land just south of the BeachLine, to purchase additional land in order to widen the right-of-way. According to a pact made on July 16, 2013, CFX tentatively agreed to pay $12 million for an extra  along the  BeachLine corridor between Cocoa and Orlando International Airport. In early October 2013, CFX and All Aboard Florida reached a formal purchase agreement for the land required for the right-of-way. Although construction was slated to originally begin in early 2015, construction of the segment started on May 22, 2019.

Also in October 2013, the Greater Orlando Aviation Authority (GOAA) board approved development of a station and maintenance facility on Orlando International Airport property, as well as an easement to build track between the station and the mainline to the coast.

For the initial opening of the line it will be single track for most of the route, however all the bridges and infrastructure is designed for double track thus saving effort when upgrading.

Maintenance 
Brightline has two maintenance facilities. One is a Running Repair Facility, located north of the West Palm Beach station at 601 15th Street, designed for maintenance and minor repair work that does not require the train to be removed from service. The facility, named "workshop b", includes a maintenance pit for accessing the underside of the trains and can handle up to four 10-car train sets.

More extensive maintenance and repair is accomplished at a second larger facility known as the Vehicle Maintenance Facility near the Orlando International Airport.

Technical

Rolling stock 
All Aboard Florida ordered five Siemens trainsets in 2014. Each Brightline trainset initially consisted of four passenger coaches, with a Siemens Charger SCB-40 diesel-electric locomotive on each end. The coaches, with interiors designed by the LAB at Rockwell Group, feature ergonomic seating, Wi-Fi, and level boarding, and meet ADA standards. Each trainset holds 248 passengers. Working with All Aboard Florida, the LAB also conceived the Brightline name, brand platform, and visual identity. The entire trainset, including passenger cars, were manufactured by Siemens in its solar-powered plant in Florin, California. Once the route to Orlando is in operation, the trainsets will be expanded to seven coaches, and five more complete trainsets will be purchased. The first of five trainsets departed the Siemens factory on December 8, 2016, and arrived in West Palm Beach on December 14. The fifth trainset arrived in South Florida in October 2017.

The trains offers two classes of service, with one "Premium" coach and three "Smart" coaches on each trainset. "Premium" offers 2x1 and four-to-a-table seating with 50 -wide seats per car and complimentary snacks and beverages, while the slightly less expensive "Smart" fare coaches seat 66 with narrower -wide seats, with snacks and beverages available for purchase. Each trainset is able to hold 248 passengers.

See also 

Transportation in Florida
Transportation in South Florida
Florida high speed rail

References

Further reading

External links 

All Aboard Florida – Miami to Orlando Passenger Rail Service – Federal Railroad Administration

 
2018 establishments in Florida
Florida East Coast Railway
Rail infrastructure in Florida
Passenger rail transportation in Florida
High-speed trains of the United States
Proposed railway lines in Florida
Railway services introduced in 2018
Airport rail links in the United States
Virgin Trains